Blackwardine is a village in Herefordshire, England (at ), in the parish of Ford and Stoke Prior. 

It is the site of a Romano-British settlement known as Black Caer Dun. A golden bracelet and ring have been found here, as well as many human remains.

Blackwardine is where Alfred Watkins first developed his theory of Ley lines on 30 June 1921. The place was excavated the same year.

References

External links 
Photos of Blackwardine and surrounding area on geograph

History of Herefordshire
Villages in Herefordshire
Ley lines